Innti was a literary movement of poets writing Modern literature in Irish, associated with a journal of the same name founded in 1970 by Michael Davitt, Nuala Ní Dhomhnaill, Gabriel Rosenstock, Louis de Paor and Liam Ó Muirthile. These writers were students of University College Cork, drawing inspiration from Seán Ó Ríordáin and Seán Ó Riada, as well as American influences such as the Beat movement and counterculture. Their reception was mixed, with Gaelic-traditionalists resenting their urbanism, social liberalism and Anglo-American influences.

Background
Some prominent Gaelic poets in the generation prior to Innti were associated with the journal Comhar. Among these, who were of relevance to Innti were Seán Ó Ríordáin and the author of Nuabhéarsaíocht, Seán Ó Tuama. These writers were both from the County Cork area and Ó Ríordáin especially introduced European-styles into Irish-language poetry and themes of modern urban life. Ó Tuama held seminars on Irish poetry at University College Cork where Innti was founded in 1970.

Aside from these local Irish influences, Innti was also influenced by the American-led counterculture of the 1960s which spread throughout the Western World. Among these foreign influences (principally from American poetry) were Beat poets such as Allen Ginsberg and Jack Kerouac. Innti marked a counterpoint to the traditional Irish nationalist idealizatio of the Gaeltacht as a somewhat austere, rural Catholic bastion of a Pre-Colonial Ireland, counter-posed to "English decadence" in the cities. The Sexual Revolution, questioning of authority, a more cosmopolitan writing of Gaelicness and the arrival of pop music were innovations in Gaelic from Innti.

The eclecticism of Innti, drawing from non-Gaelic sources, also allowed for Oriental-influences, such as the Tibetan Book of the Dead and Japanese haiku poetry, to feature alongside Anglophone and French modernist ones such as E. E. Cummings, T. S. Eliot, Wallace Stevens and Charles Baudelaire. This post-Christian environment even led to some, such as Rosenstock, exploring deeper Indo-European connections between Buddhism and pre-Christian Irish mythology and Gaelic culture.

See also
 Modern literature in Irish
 Cúil Aodha and Corca Dhuibhne

References

Bibliography

 
 
 
 
 
 

Irish literature
1970 establishments in Ireland
20th-century Irish poets
University College Cork